Geraldine S. Hines (born October 29, 1947) is an American retired judge who formerly served served as an associate justice of the Massachusetts Supreme Judicial Court from 2014 to 2017. She was nominated in July 2014 by Massachusetts Governor Deval Patrick and confirmed by an 8–0 vote of the Governor's Council. She succeeded Ralph D. Gants, who was promoted to chief justice.

Hines was born in Scott, Mississippi. She attended Tougaloo College in Madison County, Mississippi, and received her Juris Doctor degree from the University of Wisconsin Law School. From 1973 to 1976 she was a public defender with the Roxbury Defenders Committee. She was the attorney in charge of the Roxbury Defenders Committee from 1976 to 1978.  She worked in private practice throughout the 1980s and 1990s. She was confirmed for the Massachusetts Superior Court in May 2001 and promoted to the Massachusetts Appeals Court in January 2013. She was sworn into the Supreme Judicial Court on July 31, 2014, becoming the first black woman to serve on the high court. In August 2017, Justice Hines wrote for the unanimous court when it found that the Excessive Bail Clause requires courts to make findings of fact when setting unaffordable bail for an indigent defendant.

She now lives in Roxbury. In 2017, she retired as she approached the mandatory retirement age of 70.

In 2022, Hines served as the chair of a panel appointed by Boston Mayor Michelle Wu to aid in the search for a commissioner of the Boston Police Department.

See also
 List of African-American jurists

References

1947 births
Living people
People from Roxbury, Boston
People from Bolivar County, Mississippi
American women judges
Justices of the Massachusetts Supreme Judicial Court
Massachusetts Superior Court justices
Tougaloo College alumni
University of Wisconsin Law School alumni
African-American judges
21st-century African-American people
21st-century African-American women
20th-century African-American people
20th-century African-American women
Public defenders